The Children's Museum of Science and Technology (CMOST) was a science museum for children in Troy, New York. The museum had various exhibits, including almost 100 living animals. The museum did not admit adults unless accompanied by children.

History

The museum opened as The Junior Museum in 1954, a museum containing hands-on exhibits for children housed in the basement of the Rensselaer Historical Society. The museum relocated three times until it finally moved to the Rensselaer Technology Park and re-branded as the Children's Museum of Science and Technology.  The Museum permanently closed at the RPI Tech Park location at 250 Jordan Road in March 2020 as a result of the pandemic. In 2022 CMOST merged with the Children's Museum at Saratoga, who took on the management of CMOST's outreach education programs.

See also 
 Rensselaer Technology Park 
 List of museums in New York

References

External links 
  Official website

Children's museums in New York (state)
Science museums in New York (state)
University museums in New York (state)
Museums in Rensselaer County, New York
SUNY Polytechnic Institute
Museums established in 1954
1954 establishments in New York (state)